In mathematics, Parseval's theorem usually refers to the result that the Fourier transform is unitary; loosely, that the sum (or integral) of the square of a function is equal to the sum (or integral) of the square of its transform.  It originates from a 1799 theorem about series by Marc-Antoine Parseval, which was later applied to the Fourier series.  It is also known as Rayleigh's energy theorem, or Rayleigh's identity, after John William Strutt, Lord Rayleigh. 

Although the term "Parseval's theorem" is often used to describe the unitarity of any Fourier transform, especially in physics, the most general form of this property is more properly called the Plancherel theorem.

Statement of Parseval's theorem 

and

respectively. Then

where  is the imaginary unit and horizontal bars indicate complex conjugation. Substituting  and :

More generally, given an abelian locally compact group G with Pontryagin dual G^, Parseval's theorem says the Pontryagin–Fourier transform is a unitary operator between Hilbert spaces L2(G) and L2(G^) (with integration being against the appropriately scaled Haar measures on the two groups.) When G is the unit circle T, G^ is the integers and this is the case discussed above. When G is the real line , G^ is also  and the unitary transform is the Fourier transform on the real line. When G is the cyclic group Zn, again it is self-dual and the Pontryagin–Fourier transform is what is called discrete Fourier transform in applied contexts.

Parseval's theorem can also be expressed as follows:

Then

Notation used in engineering 

In electrical engineering, Parseval's theorem is often written as:

The interpretation of this form of the theorem is that the total energy of a signal can be calculated by summing power-per-sample across time or spectral power across frequency.  

For discrete time signals, the theorem becomes:

Alternatively, for the discrete Fourier transform (DFT), the relation becomes:

We show the DFT case below. For the other cases, the proof is similar.

where  represents complex conjugate.

See also 
Parseval's theorem is closely related to other mathematical results involving unitary transformations:
Parseval's identity
Plancherel's theorem
Wiener–Khinchin theorem
Bessel's inequality

Notes

External links
 Parseval's Theorem on Mathworld

Theorems in Fourier analysis